The Cook Islands women's national under-20 football team is the highest women's youth team of women's football in the Cook Islands and is controlled by the Cook Islands Football Association (CIFA).

History
The Cook Islands is with approximately 18.000 inhabitants one of the smallest nations in the world. Despite being such a small country they are quite good at the Women's football tournaments. Their under-20 team participated just twice at OFC U-20 Women's Championship so far. At the first ever edition of the tournament, in 2002, they managed to get a draw in their second game of the tournament: 1–1 against Tonga. The first game they ever played, a 15–0 loss against Australia, is still their biggest loss ever.

Eight years later, in 2010, they performed a lot better with grabbing their first victory ever: a 4–0 victory against American Samoa. After again 1–1 draw against Tonga and a 8–0 defeat against New Zealand they reached the second place, out of four teams. Notably was that all their five goals in this tournament were scored by Regina Mustonen which made her automatically the all-time top scorer of the Cook Islands Women's U-20.

In 2019 they will participate again.

OFC Championship Record

Current squad
The following players were called up for the 2019 OFC U-19 Women's Championship from 30 August–12 September in Avarua, the Cook Islands.

Caps and goals updated as of 6 September 2019, after the game against the Solomon Islands.

References

Oceanian women's national under-20 association football teams
women's